Eric Le Roi Crozier (born August 11, 1978) is an American former Major League Baseball first baseman and outfielder. For his entire minor league career, Crozier has logged 911 games, accumulating 115 home runs and 458 RBI, while batting .262.

Career
Crozier attended Independence High School and Norfolk State University. Crozier was drafted by the Cleveland Indians in the 41st round of the 2000 Major League Baseball Draft. On August 4, 2004, he was traded to the Toronto Blue Jays for Josh Phelps and made his Major League debut on September 4, 2004. In , Crozier played in the Blue Jays', Yankees', and Reds' organizations. In , he played for the Reds' Double-A affiliate, the Chattanooga Lookouts before being released on May 22. He signed with the Lancaster Barnstormers of the Atlantic League. He started  playing for Boston's Double-A affiliate, the Portland Sea Dogs, but was released during the season and signed with the Barnstormers again. In , he was left unprotected in the expansion draft and was taken by the Southern Maryland Blue Crabs.

He was purchased by the Baltimore Orioles on Friday, June 19, 2009, and spent the season with the Double-A Bowie Baysox. He last played for the Southern Maryland Blue Crabs of the independent Atlantic League in 2010.

References

External links

1978 births
Living people
African-American baseball players
Akron Aeros players
American expatriate baseball players in Canada
Baseball players from Columbus, Ohio
Buffalo Bisons (minor league) players
Chattanooga Lookouts players
Kinston Indians players
Lancaster Barnstormers players
Louisville Bats players
Major League Baseball designated hitters
Major League Baseball first basemen
Mahoning Valley Scrappers players
Norfolk State Spartans baseball players
Portland Sea Dogs players
Southern Maryland Blue Crabs players
Syracuse SkyChiefs players
Toronto Blue Jays players
Trenton Thunder players
21st-century African-American sportspeople
20th-century African-American sportspeople